Dreemurr may refer to:

 Dreemurr, the surname of multiple characters in the 2015 video game Undertale
 Asgore Dreemurr, King of the Monsters
 Toriel Dreemurr, former Queen of the Monsters and ex-wife of Asgore
 Asriel Dreemurr, son of Asgore and Toriel
 Chara Dreemurr, adopted child of Asgore and Toriel

See also
 Dreamer (disambiguation)